Duyanggang Township is a township of Xingtang County in western Hebei province, China, located about  northeast of the county seat. , it has 16 villages under its administration.

See also
List of township-level divisions of Hebei

References

Township-level divisions of Hebei